Valley Christian Academy can refer to:

Canada
Valley Christian Academy (Osler, Saskatchewan)

United States
Valley Christian Academy (Santa Maria, California)